The Red River Women's Clinic, located in Fargo, North Dakota, is the only abortion clinic in North Dakota. It began operating in 1998. The clinic's director is Tammi Kromenaker. In 2013, the Center for Reproductive Rights sued on behalf of the clinic over a law requiring doctors performing abortions to have admitting privileges to local hospitals.

References

External links
 
Clinics in the United States
1998 establishments in North Dakota
American abortion providers
Medical and health organizations based in North Dakota
Buildings and structures in Fargo, North Dakota